Ỷ Lan (Hán tự: 倚蘭, literally leaning on the orchid, ?–1117) or Empress Mother Linh Nhân (Vietnamese: Linh Nhân thái hậu, Hán tự: 靈仁太后) was a Vietnamese regent, the imperial concubine of Lý Thánh Tông, the third emperor and the natural mother of Lý Nhân Tông, the fourth emperor of the Lý dynasty. She served as regent during the absence of her spouse in 1066–68, and as co-regent during the reign of her son in 1073–1117.

Being of commoner origin, Ỷ Lan was favoured by Lý Thánh Tông because she not only gave birth to his first child but also successfully acted the regency for him during the emperor's military campaign in the kingdom of Champa. After the death of Lý Thánh Tông, Ỷ Lan one more time took the position of regent by having the Empress Mother Thượng Dương and her servants killed after an order of Ỷ Lan's son Lý Nhân Tông. For her achievements, Ỷ Lan was considered one of the most important figures during the early Lý dynasty and one of the few women who held significant political power in the dynastic time of the history of Vietnam.

Life

During Lý Thánh Tông's reign
According to Từ điển Bách khoa toàn thư Việt Nam, the birthyear of Ỷ Lan was unknown, she was born in the Thổ Lỗi (later changed to Siêu Loại) village, now Dương Xá commune, Gia Lam, Hanoi. It was said that the Emperor Lý Thánh Tông was unable to have his own child up to the age of 40, therefore he paid visit to Buddhist pagodas all over the country to pray for a child, naturally the escort of Lý Thánh Tông often attracted attention of people.

In 1063, the emperor passed the Thổ Lỗi village where he saw a girl of commoner origin leaning on an orchid tree (Vietnamese: ỷ lan) and paid no curiosity to the escort of the emperor like others, afterwards Lý Thánh Tông decided to choose the girl as his concubine with the title Lady Ỷ Lan (Ỷ Lan phu nhân).

On 25th of the first month in 1066, Lady Ỷ Lan gave birth to Lý Càn Đức, the first child of Lý Thánh Tông. Right after the birth, Lý Càn Đức was entitled crown prince of the Lý dynasty while Lady Ỷ Lan was granted the title Imperial Concubine (Nguyên phi or Thần phi). To celebrate the event that lifted the emperor's constraint of dying without issue, Lý Thánh Tông changed his era name from Chương Thánh Gia Khánh (彰聖嘉慶) to Long Chương Thiên Tự (龍章天嗣) and gave out a general amnesty for prisoners. In the second month of 1068, Ỷ Lan had a second son who was later entitled Prince Minh Nhân (Minh Nhân vương).

In the second month of 1069, Lý Thánh Tông personally led a military campaign against the kingdom of Champa and left the regentship for Ỷ Lan. Ngô Sĩ Liên in Đại Việt sử ký toàn thư recounted that after an unsuccessful period of attack, the emperor wanted to abandon the campaign but in hearing the stability of the country under the regency of the imperial concubine, Lý Thánh Tông continued to carry on his campaign, finally he was able to capture the king of Champa Rudravarman IV and fifty thousand people of Champa. During that time, Ỷ Lan accomplished her regentship by bringing the harmony to Đại Việt people and propagating Buddhism in the country, therefore Ỷ Lan was called by the name "Quan Âm".

During Lý Nhân Tông's reign
In the first month of 1072, Lý Thánh Tông died and was succeeded by the crown prince Lý Càn Đức, now called Lý Nhân Tông. After his coronation, Lý Nhân Tông gave the former empress Thượng Dương the title Empress Mother (Hoàng thái hậu) while his natural mother Ỷ Lan was granted the lower title Imperial Concubine Mother (Hoàng thái phi). Because the new emperor was only six years old, Empress Mother Thượng Dương held the regency for Lý Nhân Tông while the chancellor Lý Đạo Thành took charge in the royal court.

Furious at the fact that she did not have the regentship despite being the real mother of the emperor, Ỷ Lan influenced her son to dismiss the Empress Mother Thượng Dương that ultimately resulted in the imprisonment of the Empress Mother and 76 imperial maids in the Thượng Dương palace. Later both the Empress Mother Thượng Dương and her servants were killed and buried in the tomb of Lê Thánh Tông. After the event, Ỷ Lan was entitled Empress Mother Linh Nhân and replaced the Empress Mother Thượng Dương in the position of regent for the emperor. About this event, the historian Ngô Sĩ Liên commented that although having a devotion for Buddhism, Ỷ Lan was too ruthless in killing the innocent empress mother, he also remarked that the chancellor Lý Đạo Thành was transferred to a position in the southern border likely because he advised against the act of Ỷ Lan and the emperor.

During her second regentship, Ỷ Lan continued to prove her ability in successfully ruling the country together with the chancellor Lý Đạo Thành and the commander-in-chief Lý Thường Kiệt. When Lý army led by Lý Thường Kiệt continuously operated in the border regions and Lý Đạo Thành died in 1081, it was Ỷ Lan who looked after the agriculture and developing education in Đại Việt. At that time, the first imperial examination based on Confucian learning was organized with Lê Văn Thịnh becoming the first first-rank laureate in history of imperial examination in Vietnam. In 1096 the Queen Mother consulted the monk Thông Biện regarding the history of Buddhism in Vietnam. Since Đại Việt had a long period of peace and prosperity, Ỷ Lan began her plan of spreading Buddhism in the country by order to build over one hundred pagodas. It was believed that Ỷ Lan went into Buddhism and had built pagodas because she felt regret for the death of the Empress Mother Thượng Dương and her servants. Nevertheless, she still cared about the life of her people, for example in the Spring of 1103, she granted money for poor women in the country who had to sell themselves to be wives of widowers. In the second month of 1117, Ỷ Lan brought out the law of prohibiting people from killing buffaloes, she reasoned that buffalo was essential for farming, a buffalo being killed would cause serious effect on many people, therefore the criminal of killing buffalo and his accomplice had to be heavily punished.

On 25 July 1117, with Ỷ Lan dead, she was given the posthumous name Phù thánh linh nhân hoàng thái hậu (扶聖靈仁皇太后) and was buried in the imperial tomb Thọ Lăng which was located in Thiên Đức prefect (now Từ Sơn District, Bắc Ninh), the native land of the Lý dynasty.

Legacy
There are many shrines and temples dedicated to Ỷ Lan in the northern region of Vietnam, from her village Siêu Loại to the mountainous province Tuyen Quang, a street in Gia Lam near her birthplace is also named in honour of Ỷ Lan. Each year, people in her native district Gia Lam organizes a festival to commemorate the feats of Ỷ Lan on the 3rd of the third month in lunar calendar. A bigger festival to commemorate Ỷ Lan is held in the Ghềnh Temple (Đền Ghềnh) in Văn Lâm District, Hung Yen from 5th to 16th of the third lunar month. In 1997, a national committee was established in order to select a list of distinguished women in history of Vietnam, Ỷ Lan was one of the first choices and the only representative of the list who was well known for her political activities. Besides, Ỷ Lan is also considered the first woman who taught Vietnamese the embroidery technique. In culture, Ỷ Lan is one of the main characters in the chèo play Bài ca giữ nước (The Song of Defending the Country), the most famous work of the writer Tào Mạt.

References

Notes

Bibliography
 
 
 
 

|- style="text-align: center;"

|-

|-

Lý dynasty empresses dowager
1117 deaths
Year of birth unknown
People from Bắc Ninh province
11th-century women rulers
12th-century women rulers
11th-century Vietnamese women
12th-century Vietnamese women
Lý dynasty Buddhists